Nesle-Normandeuse is a commune in the Seine-Maritime department in the Normandy region in northern France.

Geography

Population

Places of interest
 The glassworks factory, one of the last remaining in the region.
 The church of St. Lambert, dating from the seventeenth century.
 The eighteenth century chateau built for Louis Auguste de Bourbon, grandson of Louis XV.

See also
Communes of the Seine-Maritime department

References

Communes of Seine-Maritime